Panchavadi Palam is a 1984 Indian Malayalam-language political satire film written and directed by K. G. George, based on the story Palam Apakadathil (1981) written by Veloor Krishnankutty. It stars Bharat Gopy, Nedumudi Venu, Sreenivasan, Jagathy Sreekumar, Sukumari and Thilakan in the main roles. The film tries to caricaturise the political scenario in the state of Kerala and portrays the pitiful corruption by politicians. It is the first Malayalam movie in this genre.

Plot 
A henpecked politician wants his name attached to a new bridge, even if that means destroying another, perfectly serviceable bridge. The politician Dussasana Kuruppu (Bharath Gopi) is the president of the village. He, along with his other members, tries to demolish the bridge on the advice of his fellow party member, his right hand and crooked mind Sikhandi Pillai (Nedumudi Venu). The opposition leader Ishak Tharakan (Thilakan) makes moves to thwart this and to capture the position of the village presidency. As a compromise step, both groups agree to relocate the bridge to a distant location, so that not only a new bridge, a new road also will be needed to reach the bridge.

The two tenders, one for bridge and one for road is given to two local contractors, one belongs to the ruling party and the other one supported by the opposition. Ultimately, the bridge is built and opened to the public on the same day of the marriage of Dussasana Kurup's daughter and the bridge contractor. The marriage function is attended by many, including the minister of state for public works department and the entire people, who came for marriage walks across the bridge, causing it to collapse, killing the crippled Kathavarayan (Sreenivasan). The film ends by showing the broken bridge in the background.

Cast
Bharath Gopi as Dussasana Kuruppu
Nedumudi Venu as Sikhandi Pillai
Sreevidya as Mandodhari
Thilakan as Ishak Tharakan
Sukumari as Rahel
Jagathy Sreekumar as Abel
Venu Nagavalli as Jeemudhavahanan 
Sreenivasan as Kathavarayan
Kalpana as Anarkali
K. P. Ummer as Jahangir Thatha
N. L. Balakrishnan as Bus Passenger
Alummodan as Yudaskunju
Innocent as Barabas
Mohan Jose as Opposition Party Member
V. D. Rajappan as Avarachan Swami
Shubha as Poothana

Soundtrack
The music was composed by M. B. Sreenivasan with lyrics by Chowalloor Krishnankutty.

Reception and in popular culture
The movie is considered as one of the best ever political satires in the history of Malayalam film industry. It was also one of the first of its kind of movie in Mollywood. The Palarivattom Flyover Scam has close comparisons with Panchavadi Palam in Kerala's public sphere. The Kerala High Court later compared this incident with Panchavadi Palam.

References

External links

1984 films
1984 comedy films
1980s Malayalam-language films
Films directed by K. G. George
Films scored by M. B. Sreenivasan